The Aichi Prefectural Government Office (愛知県庁 Aichi Kenchō) is the main building of the government of Aichi Prefecture. It is located in the city of Nagoya.

History 
The building was constructed before the Second World War and is in the Imperial Crown style, a mixture of western and traditional Japanese architecture. The close proximity to Nagoya Castle is reflected in the decorative roof of the structure. It is located right next to Nagoya City Hall.

The building survived the U.S. air raids of World War II.

External links 

 Homepage of the Aichi Prefectural Government Office (with details of the building)

Buildings and structures in Nagoya
City and town halls in Japan
Tourist attractions in Nagoya
Imperial Crown Style architecture